Martins Isoken Imhangbe (born 7 July 1991) is a British-Nigerian actor. He made his debut in theatre, earning an Ian Charleson Award nomination for his performance in the 2018 production of Richard II. As of 2020, he plays Will Mondrich in the Netflix series Bridgerton.

Early life
Imhangbe is from Edo State, Nigeria. He lived in Greece from the ages of 2 to 7 and spoke fluent Greek. His family then moved to South East London. He pursued a BTEC diploma in Performing Arts at Lewisham College. He auditioned for drama school but did not initially get in, instead studying Technical Theatre at Southwark College. He later re-auditioned, getting into the Royal Central School of Speech and Drama and graduating in 2013.

Career
Post graduation from drama school, Imhangbe had roles in A Human Being Died That Night, Cinderella, and Romeo and Juliet. He starred in the Complicité production of Lionboy, an adaptation of the trilogy by Zizou Corder. The show started at the Tricycle Theatre in London and went to the New Victory Theater Off-Broadway as well as to South Africa, Hong Kong, and South Korea. Imhangbe became an associate artist of Complicité. He had roles in The Skriker at the Manchester Royal Exchange as well as the London productions Octagon in 2015 and Luce and The Royale in 2016.

In 2018, Imhangbe played Bart and the Duke of Aumerle in Richard II at the Almeida Theatre in London. For his performance, he was nominated for an Ian Charleson Award. The production was also filmed as a part of National Theatre Live. That same year, he toured Barber Shop Chronicles with Fuel Theatre in Australia and New Zealand. He also appeared in Absolute Hell at the National Theatre. In 2019, Imhangbe starred as Happy Loman in Death of a Salesman at the Young Vic alongside Wendell Pierce and the titular character on the Shanghai leg of the Othello tour.

Imhangbe landed his first major onscreen role as Will Mondrich in the 2020 Netflix series Bridgerton. The character is based on the real-life boxer, Bill Richmond. Imhangbe trained for the role with Cuong Hua at The Commando Temple in Deptford.

Acting credits

Film and television

Theatre

Awards and nominations

References

External links
 
 Martins Imhangbe at Independent Talent

Living people
1991 births
21st-century British male actors
Alumni of the Royal Central School of Speech and Drama
Black British male actors
Male actors from Edo State
Male actors from London